Catastia acraspedella is a species of snout moth in the genus Catastia. It was described by Staudinger in 1879. It is found in Bulgaria.

References

Moths described in 1879
Phycitini
Moths of Europe
Moths of Asia